Tadka is an Indian Hindi-language romantic comedy-drama film directed by actor Prakash Raj, starring Nana Patekar, Ali Fazal, Shriya Saran and Tapsee Pannu. The story of the film is based in Goa and filming began in May 2016. It is a remake of the 2011 Malayalam film Salt N' Pepper. The film was released on ZEE5 on 4 November 2022.

Cast
Nana Patekar as Tukaram Dalvi
Shriya Saran as Madhura
Ali Fazal as Siddharth 
Taapsee Pannu as Nicole Anne Mascarenhas
Rajesh Sharma as Bavarchi, the cook
Lillete Dubey as Samantha Mascarenhas
Naveen Kaushik as Danny
Murali Sharma as Tebli Singh
Iravati Harshe as Urmi

Production 
Prakash Raj also starred in the Kannada, Tamil and Telugu versions of the film opposite Sneha which also features an original soundtrack by Ilaiyaraja. The film stars Nana Patekar, Ali Fazal, Shriya Saran and Tapsee Pannu. The film is based in Goa and it went on floor in May 2016.

References

External links

Tadka on ZEE5

2020s Hindi-language films
Hindi remakes of Malayalam films
Films scored by Ilaiyaraaja
Films about food and drink
Cooking films
Films set in Goa
Films shot in Goa